Benafsha Yaqoobi (also known as Benafsha Yaqubi) is an Afghan disability rights activist. She was made one of the BBC's 100 Women in 2021.

Career 

Benafsha Yaqoobi was born blind in Afghanistan and became a disability rights activist. She studied Persian literature in Iran and then took two masters degrees in Kabul, before working at the Attorney General's Office. With her husband Mahdi Salami, who is also blind, she founded the Rahyab Organisation to assist and educate blind people.

From 2019 onwards, Yaqoobi was a commissioner at the Afghan Independent Human Rights Commission (AIHRC) until she fled Afghanistan with her husband in 2021 after the Taliban retook power. On their third attempt to leave, they made it to Kabul airport and travelled to the UK.

In 2020, Yaqoobi was a candidate for the Committee on the Rights of Persons with Disabilities. She was made one of the BBC's 100 Women in 2021.

References 

Afghan disability rights activists
Afghan women activists
Afghan human rights activists
BBC 100 Women
Year of birth missing (living people)
Living people